Boxing in the 1980s was filled with important fights, events and personalities that shaped the sport. Boxing in the 1980s was shaped by many different situations, such as the continuous corporate battles between the different world sanctioning organizations, the void left by Muhammad Ali as the sport's ambassador and consequent search for a new boxing hero, the continuous presence of Don King as the sport's most famous promoter, the surge of rival promoters as Bob Arum, Butch Lewis and Murad Muhammad, and major rule changes. In 1986, Mike Tyson emerged as a fresh new face in the heavyweight division, which had seen a decline in champion quality level (particularly in the WBA side) after Ali's retirement and, later on, after longtime WBC ruler Larry Holmes' prime. In addition, the IBF and WBO began operating.

Another important aspect of boxing in the 1980s was the rivalry between five world champions: Wilfred Benítez, Roberto Durán, Marvin Hagler, Thomas Hearns and Sugar Ray Leonard. Of all the possible match-ups between these five, Benitez-Hagler was the only one that never happened. The circle of fights between these five gladiators actually began on November 30, 1979, when Leonard beat Benitez by knockout in round fifteen to win the WBC world Welterweight title, on the same night Hagler drew (tied) with Vito Antuofermo in his first bid to become the world's middleweight champion.

1980
February 2 – Salvador Sánchez becomes WBC world Featherweight champion with a fourteenth-round knockout victory over Danny Lopez in Phoenix
June 20 – Roberto Durán conquers the WBC world Welterweight title defeating Sugar Ray Leonard by unanimous decision over fifteen rounds in Montreal, Canada.
July 6 - In Bloomington, Minnesota Larry Holmes knocked down Scott LeDoux in the sixth round and then stopped the partially blinded challenger in the seventh round to retain his WBC world Heavyweight crown.
July 13 - Matthew Saad Muhammad, surviving an incredible beating in the 8th round, comes back to floor Yaqui Lopez four times, stopping him in 14 rounds in Mcafee New Jersey to retain his WBC Light Heavyweight Title.
August 2 – Thomas Hearns becomes WBA world Welterweight champion, knocking out Pipino Cuevas in two rounds in Detroit. In that same undercard, Samuel Serrano loses his WBA world Jr. Lightweight crown to Yasutsune Uehara, by knockout in round six.
September 27 – Marvin Hagler becomes world Middleweight champion, scoring a technical knockout over Alan Minter on cuts in three rounds in London. The boxers then have to be protected by police from rioting Minter fans.
October 2 – Larry Holmes retains his WBC world Heavyweight crown with an eleventh-round technical knockout over Muhammad Ali after beating Ali merciless in nearly every round. This fight is seen by many as one of the most despicable events in the history of the sport. Ali had been in a hospital for treatment for a good portion of the months before the fight, and it has been alleged that Don King made him fight for Ali to pay King the hospital bills King had gotten from Ali's stay at the hospital.
November 25 – The No Más Fight, Sugar Ray Leonard regains his WBC world Welterweight title with an eighth-round knockout of Roberto Durán, who quit inexplicably, leading to many rumors.

1981
March 28 – Santos Laciar becomes world Flyweight champion for the first time, defeating Peter Mathebula by knockout in round seven to win the WBA title, in Soweto, South Africa.
May 23 – Wilfred Benítez becomes the first Hispanic and Puerto Rican to be a three time world champion, as well as the fifth boxer to do it and the first one to do it since Henry Armstrong four decades before, when he defeats Maurice Hope by knockout in round twelve to win the WBC's world Jr. Middleweight title in Las Vegas
June 20 – Alexis Argüello becomes the sixth three time world champion in boxing history when he defeats Jim Watt by decision in fifteen rounds to win the WBC world Lightweight title in London.
June 25 – Sugar Ray Leonard conquers the WBA world Jr. Middleweight title with a ninth-round knockout of Ayub Kalule in Houston.
August 21 – The Battle of the Little Giants, Salvador Sánchez defeats Wilfredo Gómez by knockout in eight rounds to retain his WBC world Featherweight title in Las Vegas.
September 16 – A much anticipated bout takes place, and Sugar Ray Leonard unifies his WBC world Welterweight title with the WBA one by knocking out the WBA's champion Thomas Hearns in round fourteen at Las Vegas.
December 3 – Joe Frazier's last fight: He draws after ten rounds with Floyd "Jumbo" Cummings in Chicago.
December 11 – Muhammad Ali's last fight: He loses a ten-round unanimous decision to future WBC World Heavyweight Champion Trevor Berbick in Nassau, Bahamas.

1982
January 24 – Eusebio Pedroza retains his WBA world Featherweight title with a fifteen-round unanimous decision over Juan Laporte in Atlantic City. The fight proves controversial: many observers thought they had seen Pedroza commit a large amount of infractions which, in their opinion, could have led to points deductions or disqualification.
January 30 – Wilfred Benítez retains his WBC world Jr. Middleweight title with a fifteen-round unanimous decision over Roberto Durán in Las Vegas.
June 11 – After one of the most racially charged fight promotions in history, Larry Holmes retains his WBC world Heavyweight title with a thirteen-round knockout over the fighter dubbed as the White Hope, Gerry Cooney, in Las Vegas (see: Larry Holmes vs. Gerry Cooney).
July 21 – Salvador Sánchez retains his WBC world Featherweight title with a fifteenth-round knockout over Azumah Nelson in New York City. It would be Sánchez's last fight.
August 12 – Salvador Sánchez killed in a car accident in Mexico City, Mexico.
September 21  – The National Football League Players Association launches a strike against the NFL, wiping out seven games. CBS adds additional boxing telecasts during the strike.
November 9 – Sugar Ray Leonard announces the second of multiple retirements in Baltimore. (Leonard's first retirement came after the 1976 Olympic Games).
November 12 – The Battle of The Champions, Aaron Pryor retains his WBA world Jr. Welterweight title with a fourteen-round knockout of Alexis Argüello, who was attempting to become boxing's first four division world champion, in Miami.
November 13 – Tragedy in the ring: Ray Mancini retains his WBA world Lightweight title by knockout in round fourteen in Las Vegas over Duk Koo Kim, who passes away five days later, leading to the instituting of twelve rounds at the most as the mandatory fight distance and mandatory eight counts quickly.  It was also the last fight to air as part of strike replacement programming on CBS because of the NFL strike, which ended three days later.
November 26 – Larry Holmes retains his WBC world Heavyweight title with a fifteen-round unanimous decision over Randall "Tex" Cobb, fight after which Howard Cosell quits as a boxing commentator, disgusted by what he described as mismatches.
December 3 – the Carnival of Champions: Wilfredo Gómez retains his WBC world Super Bantamweight championship with a fourteen-round knockout over Lupe Pintor and Thomas Hearns becomes the WBC's world Jr. Middleweight champion with a fifteen-round majority decision over Wilfred Benítez.

1983
January 31 – In the first world title fight scheduled for twelve rounds instead of fifteen in various decades, Rafael Orono retains his WBC world Jr. Bantamweight championship with a four-round knockout over Pedro Romero in Caracas, Venezuela.
March – the IBF surges, becoming boxing's third world sanctioning body.
March 18 – Michael Spinks unifies his WBA world Light Heavyweight title with the WBC one, defeating the WBC's world champion, Dwight Muhammad Qawi, by a unanimous decision in fifteen rounds at Atlantic City.
May 1 – Edwin Rosario becomes world champion for the first time, winning the WBC world Lightweight title that had been vacated by Alexis Argüello, with a twelve-round unanimous decision over José Luis Ramírez in San Juan, Puerto Rico.
June 16 – On his 32nd birthday, Roberto Durán becomes the seventh fighter in history to be a three division world champion, knocking out WBA Jr. Middleweight champion Davey Moore in eight rounds at New York City.
August 7 – Héctor Camacho wins his first of several world titles, knocking out Rafael Limón in five rounds to win the vacant WBC Jr. Lightweight title in San Juan.
September 1 – Tragedy strikes again: Alberto Davila wins the vacant WBC world Bantamweight championship with a twelve-round knockout over Kiko Bejines, who dies three days later.
September 9 – Aaron Pryor retains his WBA world Jr. Welterweight title with a tenth-round knockout over Alexis Argüello, who once again was attempting to become the first man to win world titles in four different divisions, in Las Vegas. Both men announce their retirements after their rematch.
September 23 – Gerrie Coetzee of South Africa becomes the first African world Heavyweight champion in history, and the first White man to win the world Heavyweight title in twenty four years, when he defeats Michael Dokes for the WBA championship with a ten-round knockout in Akron.
October 25 - In Puerto Rico, Mike McCallum remain undefeated as he go 20-0 after a 10-round unanimous decision win over Manuel Jiminez.
November 10 – Marvin Hagler retains his world Middleweight title with a fifteen-round unanimous decision over Roberto Durán in Las Vegas. Duran was also attempting to become the first four division world champion in history.
December 11 – Larry Holmes vacates the WBC World Heavyweight championship and becomes the first Heavyweight champion recognized by the fledgling International Boxing Federation.
December 13 – The IBF's first world title fight, as Marvin Camel becomes world Cruiserweight champion for the second time, knocking out Roddy McDonald in five rounds for the IBF's vacant title, in Halifax, Nova Scotia Canada.

1984
February 26 - Rocky Lockridge knocked out Roger Mayweather in Round 1 to win the WBA Super Featherweight Championship in Beaumont, Texas.
March 30 – Marvin Hagler retains his undisputed world Middleweight title with a tenth-round knockout over Juan Roldán in Las Vegas.
March 31 – Wilfredo Gómez wins the WBC world Featherweight title, outpointing Juan Laporte in San Juan, Puerto Rico. 
June 15 – Thomas Hearns retains his WBC world Jr. Middleweight title with a second-round knockout over Roberto Durán, who had been forced by the WBA to leave his WBA championship vacant before the fight, in Las Vegas.
September 13 – Julio César Chávez knocks out Mario Martinez in round eight at Los Angeles, to win the vacant WBC world Jr. Lightweight title, his first of multiple titles. 
November 3 – In a rematch of their 1983 bout, José Luis Ramírez avenges his defeat against Edwin Rosario, knocking him out in four rounds to win the WBC world Lightweight title in San Juan.
November 15 - at New York's Madison Square Garden, an event called Night of Gold featured 6 American Olympians who competed in the 1984 Summer Olympics and all 6 made their professional debuts Evander Holyfield, Mark Breland, Tyrell Biggs, Virgil Hill, Meldrick Taylor and Pernell Whitaker and all 6 won their bouts.
December 8 – Azumah Nelson wins his first of multiple titles, knocking out Wilfredo Gómez in eleven rounds at San Juan, to win the WBC world Featherweight title.

1985
March 6 – Future Heavyweight champion Mike Tyson turns pro at 18 years of age. He knocked out Puerto Rican Hector Mercedez in the first round to win his first professional fight.
April 15 – The War, Marvin Hagler retains his undisputed world Middleweight championship with a three-round knockout over Thomas Hearns in Las Vegas. Round one of their fight is considered the greatest round in history by many.
April 26 – Six months after becoming a professional fighter, Jeff Fenech wins his first of three world titles, knocking out IBF world Bantamweight champion Satoshi Shingaki in the ninth round at Moore Park, Australia.
May 19 – Wilfredo Gómez becomes the eighth boxer to win world championships in three divisions, defeating Rocky Lockridge by a fifteen-round majority decision to win the WBA world Jr. Lightweight title in San Juan, Puerto Rico.
June 8 – Barry McGuigan defeats Eusebio Pedroza by a fifteen-round unanimous decision in London to win the WBA's world Featherweight title.
June 15 - Pinklon Thomas tko Mike Weaver in the eighth round to retain the WBC Heavyweight Championship in Las Vegas, Nevada.
August 10 – Héctor Camacho becomes a two time world champion, defeating WBC world Lightweight champion José Luis Ramírez in Las Vegas.
September 21 – Michael Spinks makes history by becoming the first boxer to go from world Light-Heavyweight champion to world Heavyweight champion, defeating IBF ruler Larry Holmes by a fifteen-round unanimous decision in Las Vegas. Julio César Chávez dedicates his successful defense of his WBC world Jr. Lightweight title over Dwight Pratchett in the same boxing card, to the victims of the Mexico City earthquake of September 19.
December 6 – Donald Curry unifies his WBA world Welterweight title with the WBC championship, with a two-round knockout win over WBC world champ Milton McCrory in Las Vegas.

1986
January 17 – Tim Witherspoon defeats Tony Tubbs by a fifteen-round decision in Atlanta, to win the WBA world Heavyweight title and become only the third boxer, after Floyd Patterson and Muhammad Ali, to become two-time world Heavyweight champions. Witherspoon-Tubbs begins Don King's heavyweight unification series that aims to have one universally recognized world champion at the end.
March 10 – Marvin Hagler retains his undisputed world Middleweight title with an eleventh-round knockout of John Mugabi, Thomas Hearns wins the NABF Middleweight title with a first-round knockout of James Shuler, and Gaby Canizales wins the WBA world Bantamweight title with a seventh-round knockout of Richie Sandoval, who was critically injured and almost died in the days after the fight. The three fights took place in Las Vegas.
March 22 – James Shuler dies only twelve days after fighting Thomas Hearns, in a motorcycle accident, in Pennsylvania.
March 22 – In the continuation of Don King's Heavyweight tournament, Trevor Berbick wins the WBC world title with a twelve-round decision over Pinklon Thomas at Las Vegas. In the same boxing card, Carlos De León becomes the first man to be three times Cruiserweight world champion, defeating the WBC world champion Bernard Benton by decision.
April 19 – Michael Spinks retains his IBF world Heavyweight title by a fifteen-round split decision over Larry Holmes in their Las Vegas rematch, to continue Don King's Heavyweight tournament.
May 24 – Wilfredo Gómez's last world title fight, when he loses his WBA world Jr. Lightweight title to Alfredo Layne, by knockout in round nine, in San Juan, Puerto Rico.
June 13 – Héctor Camacho retains his WBC world Lightweight title with a twelve-round split decision over fellow Puerto Rican Edwin Rosario at the Madison Square Garden, New York City.
June 23 – The Triple Header: Thomas Hearns retains his WBC world Jr. Middleweight title with an eighth-round knockout win against former world champion Mark Medal, Roberto Durán loses a ten-round decision to Marvin Hagler's half brother Robbie Sims, and Barry McGuigan loses his WBA world Featherweight title on a fifteen-round unanimous decision to Stevie Cruz.
July 12 – Evander Holyfield wins his first world title, the WBA's Cruiserweight championship, with a fifteen-round decision over Dwight Muhammad Qawi.
July 19 – The fourth installment of Don King's Heavyweight tournament as Tim Witherspoon retains his WBA world title with an eleventh-round knockout of Frank Bruno in London.
September 6 – Don King's Heavyweight tournament continues as Michael Spinks defeats Steffen Tangstad by a knockout in round four to retain his IBF belt, in Las Vegas.
November 22 – In the words of HBO Boxing commentator, Barry Tompkins, And we have a new era in Boxing, when Mike Tyson becomes the youngest world Heavyweight champion in history, beating Trevor Berbick by knockout in round two to take the WBC world championship as Don King's Heavyweight tournament continues in Las Vegas.
December 12 – In the next chapter of Don King's Heavyweight tournament, James Smith becomes WBA world Heavyweight champion, defeating Tim Witherspoon by knockout in round one, in New York City.

1987
March 7 – Mike Tyson unifies the WBC and WBA world Heavyweight titles with a twelve-round unanimous decision win over James Smith, in Las Vegas.
March 9 – Thomas Hearns becomes the ninth boxer in history to win world titles in three divisions, and the first American to do so since Henry Armstrong, knocking out WBC world Light-Heavyweight champion Dennis Andries, born in Guyana but a British resident, in round ten in Detroit. After a 10-year absence George Foreman returns as he beat Steve Zouski by TKO in Round 4 in Sacramento.
April 6 – In what is considered by many to be the greatest comeback in boxing history, Sugar Ray Leonard comes back after three and a half years without fighting to outpoint Marvin Hagler and win the undisputed world Middleweight championship in Las Vegas. Leonard becomes the tenth boxer in history to be world champion in three different divisions.
May 30 – Don King's Heavyweight tournament continues as Tony Tucker defeats Buster Douglas to win the IBF's world Heavyweight title that had been vacated by Michael Spinks, and Mike Tyson retains his WBC and WBA titles with a sixth-round knockout over former world champion Pinklon Thomas in Las Vegas.
August 1 – The final of Don King's Heavyweight tournament: Mike Tyson defeats Tony Tucker by a twelve-round unanimous decision to become undisputed world Heavyweight champion.
October 4 – Wilfredo Vazquez wins the first of three world titles by knocking out WBA world Bantamweight champion Chan-Yong Park in ten rounds at Seoul, South Korea.
October 16- Mike Tyson retains the undisputed heavyweight championship against Tyrell Biggs by seventh round knockout in Atlantic City.
October 28 – Jorge Vaca dethrones WBC world Welterweight champion Lloyd Honeyghan with a controversial eighth round technical decision in London. The controversy was that a point deducted to Honeyghan by the referee that night proved to be the margin of difference.
October 29 – Thomas Hearns makes history, becoming the first boxer in history to win world titles at four different divisions, knocking out Juan Roldán in four rounds for the WBC's vacant world Middleweight title in Las Vegas.

1988
January 22 – Mike Tyson retains his undisputed world Heavyweight championship with a fourth-round knockout win against former world champion Larry Holmes in Atlantic City.
March 7 – Jeff Fenech becomes the eleventh boxer to win world titles in three different divisions, knocking out former world champion Victor Callejas in ten rounds at Sydney, for the vacant WBC world Featherweight title.
March 21 - Mike Tyson traveled to Japan as he beat Tony Tubbs by TKO in Round 2 to retain his undisputed world Heavyweight title.
March 29 – Lloyd Honeyghan recovers the WBC world Welterweight championship with a third-round knockout of Jorge Vaca in their rematch at London.
April 9 – Evander Holyfield unifies his WBA world Cruiserweight title with the WBC one, knocking out Carlos De León in eight rounds at Las Vegas.
June 6 – Iran Barkley conquers the WBC world Middleweight title with a third-round knockout of Thomas Hearns, who had cut Barkley seriously in round two, in Las Vegas.
June 27 – Mike Tyson retains his undisputed world Heavyweight title with a first-round knockout of former world champion Michael Spinks in Atlantic City. 
July 29 – In an extremely controversial bout, Colombia's Tomas Molinares becomes WBA world Welterweight champion by knocking out Marlon Starling in six rounds in Atlantic City. Starling's camp protested that the knockout punch had landed after the bell to end the round, therefore, it should not have counted. After further review, the WBA agreed with Starling's camp, but decided not to withdraw recognition from Molinares as world champion.
August 4 – The last fifteen rounds bout, as Jorge Páez defeats Calvin Grove by a majority decision to become the IBF's world Featherweight champion, in Mexicali, Mexico.
October 29 – Julio César Chávez unifies his WBA world Lightweight title with the WBC one, beating his friend and neighbor, José Luis Ramírez, by a technical decision in round eleven in Las Vegas.
November 7 – The first fight in many decades involving titles in two different categories and the WBC world Super Middleweight championship sees Sugar Ray Leonard become boxing's second four division world champion and five division world champion when he knocks out WBC world Light Heavyweight champion Donnie Lalonde in the ninth round, also winning the WBC's vacant Super Middleweight championship, at Las Vegas.

1989
February 11 - Rene Jacquot beat Donald Curry in a twelve-round unanimous decision to win the WBC Light Middleweight Championship in Grenoble, Isere France
February 24  – Roberto Durán makes history by becoming the third fighter to win world titles in four different divisions, the first Hispanic to do so and also the fighter with the longest period between his first and latest world championships (17 years) when he defeats Iran Barkley by a split decision to become the WBC's world Middleweight champion, in Atlantic City.
February 25 – Mike Tyson retains his undisputed world Heavyweight championship, with a fifth-round knockout over future world champion Frank Bruno in Las Vegas.
March 6 – The WBO's first major world championship bout, as Héctor Camacho defeats Ray Mancini by unanimous twelve-round decision, to win the WBO's vacant world Jr. Welterweight title and become boxing's twelfth world champion in three different divisions, at Las Vegas.
May 13 – Julio César Chávez becomes the thirteenth boxer to win world titles in three or more different categories, knocking out Roger Mayweather in ten rounds in their rematch, to win the WBC's world Jr. Welterweight title in Los Angeles.
May 17 – Carlos De León becomes the first boxer to win the world Cruiserweight title four times (and also joins a handful of champions who have won world titles in one division that many times) when he knocks out Sammy Reeson in nine rounds in London, picking up the WBC belt that had been vacated by his former conqueror, Evander Holyfield, when Holyfield moved to the Heavyweight division.
June 12 – Sugar Ray Leonard retains his WBC world Super Middleweight title with a twelve-round draw in a rematch with Thomas Hearns in Las Vegas.
June 21- Mike Tyson retains undisputed heavyweight championship by first round knockout against Carl Williams in Atlantic City.
July 8 - John Mugabi who 3 years earlier fought Marvin Hagler for the Undisputed Middleweight Championship, knocks out René Jacquot in the first round to win the WBC Light Middleweight Championship in Cergy-Pontoise, Val-d'Oise, France.
December 7 – The decade in boxing finishes almost where it started, as Sugar Ray Leonard defends his WBC world Super Middleweight title with a twelve-round unanimous decision victory over Roberto Durán in their third encounter.

References

 1980s
1980s in sports
1980s in boxing